XEL-AM is a radio station in Los Reyes Acaquilpan, State of Mexico, serving Mexico City. Broadcasting on 1260 kHz, XEL-AM is owned by Grupo ACIR. The station is known as La Comadre with a grupera format.

History
The first concession for what would become XEL was actually for a station on 1140 kHz with the call sign XETA, made to Manuel Espinosa Tagle on August 16, 1932. The station spent the next 17 years under a revolving door of owners: Esperanza Romero González, Banco Capitalizador de Ahorros, Financiera de Inversiones, Ramón Ferreiro Rodriguez, Fidel Hernández Calderón, and finally stability under Radio Impulsora Hérdez, S.A. The station became XEL-AM by the 1950s and moved to 1260 kHz in the 1960s. The station for most of its life carried the name "Radio Capital".

In 1964, accountant Francisco Ibarra bought the station, making it Grupo ACIR's first station in Mexico City. The format was changed to rock in English with the slogan Una buena costumbre de la gente joven ("A good habit of young people"). In 1989, the station became the general format "Radio ACIR", a format moved from XEVOZ-AM 1590; that station picked up the rock music format and Radio Capital name.

In May 2003, the station was relaunched as "La 12 60" with a focus on self-help, health and family affairs matters.

On July 1, 2015, as part of larger changes at Grupo ACIR, the self-help format was jettisoned to make XEL the flagship station of ACIR's La Comadre regional Mexican format, returning the format to Mexico City.

On July 31, 2021, XEL-AM changed its format to Radio La Guadalupana, affiliated with ESNE Radio and being its second station in Mexico, after XEBBB-AM in Guadalajara. It was also the second Catholic station to broadcast in the Mexico City area, after Radio María leased out XEUR-AM 1530 in December 2020. ACIR attempted to sell the station to an ESNE affiliate, an act blocked by the Federal Telecommunications Institute (IFT), which in its decision considered that the proposed controlling owner, ESNE Radio México, S.A. de C.V., acted like a religious organization and was thus barred from owning a broadcast station. After this event, ESNE Radio opted to stop operating the station on December 31, with ACIR resuming La Comadre programming on January 1, 2022.

References

External links
iheart Mexico City website

Radio stations established in 1932
1932 establishments in Mexico
Radio stations in Mexico City
Radio stations in the State of Mexico
Grupo ACIR